John Robert Dillon (died 1948) was an architect active in Atlanta, Georgia. He became associated with the Bruce and Morgan firm in 1903, which became Morgan and Dillon in 1904. A graduate of Northwestern School of Architecture, he was named a Fellow in the American Institute of Architects in 1948.

His works include:
 Early County Courthouse (1904–05)
 Georgia Railway and Power Building (1904-7)
 Healey Building (1913)
 Masonic Temple (Atlanta)
 Municipal Auditorium (Atlanta, Georgia), now the GSU Alumni Hall
 All Saints' Episcopal Church (Atlanta)
 Oglethorpe University - some buildings
 University of Chicago - some buildings
 Grant Estate. Now Cherokee Town Club
 Lena Swift Huntley Residence (wife of Charles Thomas Swift) 
 Retail Credit Company Building

References

Architects from Georgia (U.S. state)
1948 deaths
Year of birth missing